Following is a list of past and present Members of Parliament (MPs) of the United Kingdom whose surnames begin with U.  The dates in parentheses are the periods for which they were MPs.  This list is complete for MPs since 1892.

Thomas Usborne (1892 – 1900) Conservative for Chelmsford
Robert Uniacke-Penrose-Fitzgerald (1885–1906) Conservative for Cambridge
Alexander Ure (1895–1913) Liberal for Linlithgowshire
Domhnall Ua Buachalla (1918–1922) Sinn Féin for North Kildare
Lynn Ungoed-Thomas (1945–1962)
David Urquhart (1847–1852)
Kitty Ussher (2005–2010)
 U